Rafael Tobías Hernández Alvarado (born August 24, 1953) is a Venezuelan former professional baseball catcher. He played briefly for the Toronto Blue Jays of Major League Baseball (MLB) in its 1984 season.

Hernández was regarded as a good-fielding, light-hitting catcher in  the Jays organization, but after a long history of injuries he was able to reach the majors just at 31. In his brief stint at Toronto, he went 1-for-2 and scored a run in three games.

Additionally, he posted a .223 average with 11 home runs and 122 RBI in parts of seven minor league seasons between 1979 and 1985. 

In between, Hernández played winter ball with the Cardenales de Lara club of the Venezuelan League in a span of 14 seasons from 1978 through 1991.

See also
 List of players from Venezuela in Major League Baseball

References

External links

1958 births
Living people
Cardenales de Lara players
Kinston Blue Jays players
Kinston Eagles players
Knoxville Blue Jays players
Major League Baseball catchers
Major League Baseball players from Venezuela
Medicine Hat Blue Jays players
People from Calabozo
Syracuse Chiefs players
Toledo Mud Hens players
Toronto Blue Jays players
Utica Blue Jays players
Venezuelan expatriate baseball players in Canada
Venezuelan expatriate baseball players in the United States